Drapery Trust was formed in 1925 by Clarence Hatry, a notorious British financier. He had made his fortune in speculating on oil stocks, and had convinced investors to promote department stores and bring them under the management of a retail conglomerate.

The business grew with a number of acquisitions:

Bon Marche (Gloucester)
Swan & Edgar (Piccadilly Circus) 1927
Bobby & Co.(Margate, Cliftonville, Folkestone, Eastbourne, Bournemouth, Exeter, Southport, Leamington Spa, Torquay) 1927
Footman, Pretty & Co (Ipswich)
Marshalls Ltd; 
Kennards (Croydon, Staines) 1926
Drages Furniture Store (High Holborn, Birmingham, Manchester) 1928

The business was acquired by Debenhams in 1927.

The business was kept as a separate subsidiary from the main Debenhams group, but with board members of Debenhams joining the board of the trust. At the time it was reported that Drapery Trust controlled 60 stores of department and specialist kind. The Drages business was sold in 1937 to Great Universal Stores.

In the 1970s it was decided to bring all the business under one brand, and so the stores of the Drapery Trust were either converted into Debenhams, or were closed.

References

External links
 

Defunct department stores of the United Kingdom
Debenhams
Holding companies of the United Kingdom
1925 establishments in England
British companies established in 1925
Holding companies established in 1925
Retail companies established in 1925